Rock of Ages is located in the Teton Range, Grand Teton National Park in the U.S. state of Wyoming. Rock of Ages is  ESE of The Jaw and on the south side of Hanging Canyon.

References

Mountains of Grand Teton National Park
Mountains of Wyoming
Mountains of Teton County, Wyoming